The British Soap Award for Best On-Screen Partnership is an award presented annually by the British Soap Awards. Unlike the awards for Best Leading Performer and Best British Soap, the award is voted for by a panel. EastEnders is the most awarded soap in the category, with eight wins. Emmerdale is the only current soap not to have won a Best On-Screen Partnership award, while Family Affairs (1997–2005) never won the accolade. The award is currently held by EastEnders actresses Lacey Turner and Gillian Wright.

Winners and nominees

Wins and nominations by soap

References

Soap opera awards
The British Soap Awards